After the weakening of the Byzantine Empire and the Bulgarian Empire in the middle and late 13th century, the northern territory of modern day Albania became part of Serbia. Firstly, as part of Serbian Grand Principality and later as part of Serbian Empire. The southern part was governed by the semi-independent, Serbian-ruled Despotate of Epirus. Between 1272 and 1368, some areas of the modern-day state were also ruled by the Angevins as the Kingdom of Albania. In the late 14th century, Albanian Principalities were created throughout Albania.

Background

Migration wave through the Balkans
From the sixth century, large numbers of Slavs, Avars and Bulgars invaded the Balkan provinces of the East Roman Empire. Prior to Roman times, the Balkans had already consisted of a large culturally and ethnically mixed population. The 'ancient' inhabitants, generically referred to as Ancient Greeks, Illyrians, Thracians and Dacians, were split into many smaller tribes who had different customs and even languages. The picture was mixed further in Roman times, when Roman colonists were settled the Balkan cities, as well as Germanic, Celtic and Sarmatian federates in the countryside. This led to a process of Romanization of the natives who dwelt in cities in Illyria and Pannonia, whilst Greek was the formal language in Thrace, Epirus, and Macedonia (Roman province). In the countryside, many of the natives would join the foreign elements in raiding imperial territory. Later, there was an extensive Slavonization of the Balkans. Nevertheless, small pockets of people preserved an archaic language. The geographic origin of these proto-Albanians is disputed, and cannot be proven for lack of big archaeological or historical data pertaining to Albanians prior to the twelfth century. However, scholars explain that Albanian language comes from either Illyrian or Thracian or both, with a considerate influence of Latin. Later on Slavic and Turkish loanwords influenced it, although to a much lesser extent.

Serbian state

From the time of their arrival to the Balkans in the 6th century until the 9th century, The Slavs were divided into many small tribes, called Sclavinias by the Byzantines. Each tribe was composed of several family clans, whose affairs were ruled by elders, headed by one ruler – the “Zhupan” (chieftain).(See also South Slavs). We know very little about these early centuries. Much of what we know is derived from Byzantine accounts, and information is rather sketchy since the Byzantines only recorded their dealings with the Serbs during times of war. During the period from the 7th to the 10th century, the early medieval Principality of Serbia would become one of the most important states in the region, uniting neighboring Serbian tribes into a single state.

Albania under Serbian rule

The founder of the Serbian monarchy, Stefan Nemanja managed to control a part of northern Albania, which included cities of Shkodër, Dajç and Drivast. He was a native of what is now Podgorica, whence he built up a compact Serbian state, comprising the Zeta (modern Montenegro), and the Land of Hum (the "Hill" country, now the Herzegovina), northern Albania and the modern kingdom of Serbia, with a sea-frontage on the Bocche di Cattaro, whose municipality in 1186 passed a resolution describing him as "Our Lord Nemanja, Great jupan of Rascia." 

In 1219 the seat of the Serbian Orthodox Church was set in Peja, Dukagjin in modern day Kosovo after the church obtained autocephalous or independent status.

In 1282 the Serbian king Stefan Uroš II Milutin gained control of the Albanian cities of Lezhë and Debar and, at some time in 1284, the city of Dyrrachion (modern Durrës).

During the reign of Stefan Dushan, 1331–55, taking advantage of the Byzantine civil war of 1341–1347, the area of Elbasan, Krujë, Berat and Vlora (Principality of Valona) were added to the nascent Serbian Empire. In 1346 the patriarchal throne was permanently established at the Pec Monastery. In 1346, after Epirus and Thessaly were added to the Serbian Empire, Dusan was crowned the emperor of the Serbs and Greeks in the city of Skopje. A legal code was promulgated and the bishopric of Pec was proclaimed a patriarchate which established the Serbian Orthodox Church as independent from Constantinople. Prizren became the political capital of the Serbian Empire and was the chief Serbian city of trade and commerce. After the death of Dushan in 1355, Kosovo was ruled by King Vukasin Mrnjavcevic, who was a co-ruler with Tsar Uros, the last of the Nemanjic rulers.

Philip V of France and Pope John XXII, sought to turn the Albanian nobles in northern Albania against Stefan Milutin. In June 1319, the Pope sent several letters to the local feudal lords, urging them to overthrow the rule of the Serbian king. Stefan Milutin has suppressed rebels without much difficulty.

After the fall of the Serbian Empire, several Albanian Principalities were created in its territories.

Rule and rivalry in the Despotate of Epirus

After Emperor Stefan Uroš IV Dušan conquered Epirus and Acarnania in 1348, he appointed as governor of these regions Simeon Uroš, whom he had granted the title of despotes traditionally reserved for emperors' brothers and younger sons. Simeon Uroš consolidated his position in relation to the local aristocracy by marrying Thomais, the daughter of the former ruler of Epirus, John Orsini.

Simeon Uroš's relatively uneventful governorship was interrupted when, shortly after Dušan's death in 1355, his brother-in-law Nikephoros II Orsini, the deposed ruler of Epirus, reappeared in Greece and gained the support of the nobility in Thessaly and Epirus. In 1356 Nikephoros entered Epirus and forced Simeon Uroš to flee to Kastoria.

In the summer of 1358, Nikephoros II Orsini, the last despot of Epirus of the Orsini dynasty, fought with the Albanian chieftains in Acheloos, Acarnania. The Albanian chieftains won the war and they managed to create two new states in the southern territories of the Despotate of Epirus. Because a number of Albanian lords actively supported the successful Serbian campaign in Thessaly and Epirus, the Serbian Tsar granted them specific regions and offered them the Byzantine title of despotes in order to secure their loyalty.

The two Albanian lead states were: the first with its capital in Arta was under the Albanian nobleman Peter Losha, and the second, centered in Angelokastron, was ruled by Gjin Bua Shpata. After the death of Peter Losha in 1374, the Albanian despotates of Arta and Angelocastron were united under the rule of Despot Gjin Bua Shpata. The territory of this despotate was from the Corinth Gulf to Acheron River in the North, neighboring with the Principality of John Zenevisi, another state created in the area of the Despotate of Epirus. The Despotate of Epirus managed to control in this period only the eastern part of Epirus, with its capital in Ioannina. During this period the Despotate of Epirus was ruled by Thomas II Preljubović, who was in an open conflict with Gjin Bue Shpata. In 1375, Gjin Bue Shpata started an offensive in Ioannina, but he couldn't invade the city, as Preljubović received help from the Ottomans to aid him in the cities defense. Although Shpata married with the sister of Thomas II Preljubović, Helena their war did not stop.

References

Library of Congress Country Study of Albania

Medieval Albania
Subdivisions of the Serbian Empire
Kingdom of Serbia (medieval)
Albania–Serbia relations
13th century in Serbia
14th century in Serbia